Belovskaya is a rural locality (a village) in Bogorodskoye Rural Settlement, Ust-Kubinsky District, Vologda Oblast, Russia. The population was 2 as of 2002.

Geography 
Belovskaya is located 73 km northwest of Ustye (the district's administrative centre) by road. Markovskaya is the nearest rural locality.

References 

Rural localities in Tarnogsky District